Zero Fucks Given is a 2021 Franco-Belgian comedy-drama film directed by Emmanuel Marre and Julie Lecoustre. The film stars Adèle Exarchopoulos. It screened in the 60th Critics' Week section at the 2021 Cannes Film Festival on 11 July 2021.

Premise
After the death of her mother in a car accident, Cassandre turns her back on her past: she leaves her father and sister in Huy and becomes a flight attendant for a low-cost carrier based in Lanzarote. Seemingly blasé and giving little thought to her future, at 26 she lives day-to-day drifting through work, living together with the staff on call, partying in nightclubs, and brief encounters with strangers from dating apps.

Cast

Release
Zero Fucks Given was selected to be screened in the 60th Critics' Week section at the 2021 Cannes Film Festival. It had its world premiere at Cannes on 11 July 2021. It was theatrically released by Condor in France on 2 March 2022. It was theatrically released by Cinéart in Belgium on 16 March 2022.

Reception

Box office
Zero Fucks Given grossed $0 in North America, $23,951 in Italy, $18,209 in Colombia and $966,168 in France for a worldwide total of $1,008,328, against an estimated production budget of $2.1 million.

Critical response
On Rotten Tomatoes, the film holds an approval rating of 94% based on 18 reviews, with an average rating of 6.90/10. According to Metacritic, which assigned a weighted average score of 77 out of 100 based on 5 critics, the film received "generally favorable reviews".

Jordan Mintzer of The Hollywood Reporter praised Marre and Lecoustre's depiction of Cassandre's "ruthless hyper-[capitalist]" working life and commended Exarchopoulos's performance, writing, "Even when we're stuck with Cassandre in the same routine, the film remains engrossing because of how committed Exarchopoulos is to her role, putting on way too much makeup so she can resemble the perfect Wing stewardess."

Awards and nominations

References

External links
 
 

2021 films
2020s French films
2020s French-language films
2021 comedy-drama films
Belgian comedy-drama films
French comedy-drama films
Films shot in Belgium
Films shot in the Canary Islands
Films about flight attendants